Evarcha certa is a jumping spider species in the genus Evarcha that lives in Ethiopia and Guinea. The female was first described in 2002.

References

Salticidae
Fauna of Ethiopia
Fauna of Guinea
Spiders of Africa
Spiders described in 2002
Taxa named by Wanda Wesołowska